Tingwall may refer to the following places in Scotland:

Tingwall, Orkney
Tingwall, Shetland
Tingwall Airport, Shetland Islands

See also
 Dingwall
 Tynwald
 Thingwall 
 Þingvellir
 Tingvoll